The Black Hills State Yellow Jackets are the athletic sports teams for Black Hills State University. They are currently a member of the NCAA Division II and participate in the Rocky Mountain Athletic Conference (RMAC). BHSU Rodeo teams are members of the National Intercollegiate Rodeo Association (NIRA).

Varsity sports

Men's sports
 Basketball
 Cross Country
 Football
 Rodeo
 Track and Field

Women's sports
 Basketball
 Cross Country
 Golf
 Rodeo
 Soccer (Fall 2016)
 Softball
 Track and Field
 Triathlon
 Volleyball

Rivalry

Black Hills State's main athletic rival is the South Dakota School of Mines and Technology Hardrockers. The rivalry is generated from proximity, with SDSM&T located less than 50 miles to the east in Rapid City. Educational differences between the schools also help fuel the rivalry, with BHSU being mainly a liberal arts college and SDSM&T an engineering research university. The football rivalry is the second most-frequently played series in the US, behind Harvard-Yale. It is also the oldest football series west of the Mississippi River. The last game of each season is reserved for the two schools to play, however the two schools may play twice in the same season. In the later game, they battle for the Homestake Trophy, named for a mine in the Black Hills area. This game is called the Black Hills Brawl, due to the ferocity in which the teams play each other.

Softball
The Yellow Jackets softball team appeared in the first Women's College World Series in 1969.

Transition to NCAA
In July 2010 the university received word it had been accepted into NCAA Division II. The move to the NCAA was a multiple-year process that included a two-year candidacy period followed by a one-year provisional season, in which BHSU was not allowed to advance into NCAA postseason play. The Rocky Mountain Athletic Conference (RMAC) extended an invitation for Black Hills State University to be considered for membership. Following the successful transition, the university became a full member of the NCAA DII in 2013.

Notable alumni
 Zac Alcorn – Former NFL tight end

References

External links